Manitoba Provincial Road 350 is a provincial road in the south-central section of the Canadian province of Manitoba.

Route description 

The route begins at PR 242 east of Lavenham, and terminates at the Yellowhead Highway near Woodside.

PR 350 then turns west for  before turning north once again at Mile 56N (formerly westbound PR 461). It continues for  through MacGregor before intersecting the Trans-Canada Highway just north of the village.

PR 350 is mainly a gravel road with a small paved section as it passes through MacGregor.

History 

In the early 1990s, the Manitoba government decommissioned a number of provincial secondary roads and returned the maintenance of these roads back to the rural municipalities. A section of the original PR 350 was included in this decommissioning.

After the decommissioning of this section, the road was renamed Ladysmith Road. It is now maintained by the Rural Municipality of Victoria.

The mayor is Kelli Masson

References

350